Hasanabad (also Romanized as Ḩasanābād) is a village in Dabuy-ye Jonubi Rural District, Dabudasht District, Amol County, Mazandaran Province, Iran.

It is located on the Caspian Sea.

At the 2006 census, its population was 133, in 37 families.

References 

Populated places in Amol County
Populated coastal places in Iran
Populated places on the Caspian Sea